The Chamorro family has its origin in Spain.  A branch of the family became prominent in Nicaragua in the 18th century and its influence continues to the present.  Historically, the Chamorros have been closely associated with the Conservatives, but the Sandinista Revolution has divided their loyalties, with some members supporting the Sandinistas.  Outstanding members of this family are:

Notes

External source errors
Pedro Joaquín Chamorro Alfaro is incorrectly listed as Pedro Joaquín Chamorro Bolaños in the following sources:
DATOS HISTORICOS
Familia Chamorro
MSN - ENCARTA
Pedro Joaquín Chamorro Bolaños is incorrectly listed as Pedro José Chamorro Bolaños in the following source:
3 Conquistador and Colonial Elites of Central America

References
 Genealogia Familia Chamorro, por El Dr. Emilio Alvarez Lejarza (1951), Talleres Tipograficos y Litograficos de la Editorial Catolica, S. A. Managua, Nic.-C. A.
 Recorrido Historico de las Principales Figuras de la Familia Chamorro, Emilio Alvarez Lejarza, Revista Conservadora del Pensamiento Centroamericano, Vol. XIX - No. 91 (Abril, 1968)
 La Prensa - September 11, 2000

Nicaraguan families
Political families
Family trees